The 1992–93 NBA season was the Clippers' 23rd season in the National Basketball Association, and their 9th season in Los Angeles. In the off-season, the Clippers acquired Mark Jackson from the New York Knicks, acquired second-year center Stanley Roberts from the Orlando Magic in a three-team trade, acquired Hot Plate Williams from the Washington Bullets, and signed free agent Kiki Vandeweghe. After losing their first three games, the Clippers played solid basketball winning 12 of their next 16 games, and later held a 26–25 record at the All-Star break. The Clippers finished fourth in the Pacific Division with a 41–41 record, making their second consecutive playoff appearance.

Danny Manning averaged 22.8 points, 6.6 rebounds and 1.3 blocks per game, and was selected for the 1993 NBA All-Star Game, while Ron Harper averaged 18.0 points, 4.5 assists and 2.2 steals per game, and Jackson provided the team with 14.4 points, 8.8 assists and 1.7 steals per game. In addition, Ken Norman contributed 15.0 points and 7.5 rebounds per game, while Roberts provided with 11.3 points, 6.2 rebounds and 1.8 blocks per game, and Loy Vaught averaged 9.4 points and 6.2 rebounds per game off the bench.

However, in the Western Conference First Round of the playoffs, the Clippers lost to the Houston Rockets in five games. Following the season, head coach Larry Brown resigned and left to take a coaching job with the Indiana Pacers, while Norman signed as a free agent with the Milwaukee Bucks, and Vandeweghe retired. The Clippers would not make it back to the playoffs again until 1997.

Draft picks

Roster

Regular season

Season standings

z – clinched division title
y – clinched division title
x – clinched playoff spot

Record vs. opponents

Game log

Regular season

Playoffs

|- align="center" bgcolor="#ffcccc"
| 1
| April 29
| @ Houston
| L 94–117
| Mark Jackson (26)
| three players tied (8)
| Gary Grant (8)
| The Summit16,611
| 0–1
|- align="center" bgcolor="#ccffcc"
| 2
| May 1
| @ Houston
| W 95–83
| Ron Harper (29)
| Ken Norman (12)
| Mark Jackson (8)
| The Summit16,611
| 1–1
|- align="center" bgcolor="#ffcccc"
| 3
| May 3
| Houston
| L 99–111
| Danny Manning (23)
| Ron Harper (9)
| Mark Jackson (8)
| Los Angeles Memorial Sports Arena12,628
| 1–2
|- align="center" bgcolor="#ccffcc"
| 4
| May 5
| Houston
| W 93–90
| Ron Harper (21)
| Stanley Roberts (13)
| Mark Jackson (7)
| Los Angeles Memorial Sports Arena14,710
| 2–2
|- align="center" bgcolor="#ffcccc"
| 5
| May 8
| @ Houston
| L 80–84
| Danny Manning (24)
| Danny Manning (12)
| Mark Jackson (9)
| The Summit16,611
| 2–3
|-

Player statistics

Season

Playoffs

Awards, records and milestones

All-Star
Danny Manning selected as a reserve forward for the Western Conference All-Stars.  Manning is the first Clipper All-Star since Marques Johnson was selected in 1986.

Transactions
The Clippers were involved in the following transactions during the 1992–93 season.

Trades

Free agents

Additions

Subtractions

Player Transactions Citation:

See also
 Los Angeles Clippers
 Los Angeles Memorial Sports Arena

References

Los Angeles Clippers seasons